Heaven in Her Arms are a Japanese post-hardcore band from Tokyo. Named after a song from Converge's 2001 album Jane Doe, they have released 3 studio albums, 2 EPs and 6 splits since 2005. In a positive review of the band's 2017 album White Halo, Pitchfork writer Andy O'Connor described their style as an amalgamation of extreme metal, post-rock, and 1990s emo. He compared them to fellow Tokyo band Envy and named both bands a strong influence on their one-time tour-mates Deafheaven. As of 2020, Heaven in Her Arms are signed to Daymare Recordings in Japan, Moment of Collapse Records in Europe, and Translation Loss in North America.

Members 
Current members
Kent Aoki – guitar, vocals
Katsuta – guitar
Kentaro – bass
Hiroki "Rocky" Watanabe – drums

Past members
Takayuki Ryuzaki – guitar (2001-2019)

Discography 
Studio albums
黒斑の侵蝕 / Erosion of the Black Speckle (2007)
幻月 / Paraselene (2010)
白暈 / White Halo (2017)

EPs
Heaven in Her Arms (2006)
被覆する閉塞 / Duplex Coated Obstruction (2009)

Splits
Heaven in Her Arms / In Between (2005)
Heaven in Her Arms / Tomato Steal (2006)
Koenji (with Killie) (2007)
Heaven in Her Arms / Aussitôt Mort (2011)
Heaven in Her Arms / Yumi (2012)
刻光 (with Cohol) (2013)

References

External links 

Musical groups from Tokyo
Post-hardcore groups
Japanese hardcore punk groups
Post-metal musical groups
Japanese post-rock groups
Screamo musical groups
Japanese emo musical groups
Musical quintets